Liuvigoto (7th-century – fl. 693) was a Visigoth queen consort by marriage to king Erwig (680–687).

In 683, her spouse attempted to secure a reform in which the remarriage of a widow after the death of a king was banned as adultery, in order to prevent the custom of usurpers marrying the widows of their predecessors to legitimize their rule. 

She was the mother of queen Cixilo. When her son-in-law succeeded her husband in 687, she and her daughters were forced to enter a convent. 

In the Zaragoza Council of 691, one of the suggested reforms was to force the widow of a king to enter a convent after the death of her spouse, which may be influenced by her activity. In 691, she was asked to participate in the rebellion of Sisebert against the king. In the Sixteenth Council of Toledo of 693, the conspirators were named as Liubigotona, Frogellius, Theodemir, Luvilana and Thekla.

References 

Visigothic queens consort
7th-century people of the Visigothic Kingdom
7th-century women